Note: Some of these offices were continued from the Earldom of Cornwall.

Offices

Lord Steward and Lord Warden of the Stannaries in Cornwall and Devon
See Lord Warden of the Stannaries

Vice-Admiral of Cornwall
See List of Vice-Admirals of Cornwall

High Sheriff of Cornwall
 See High Sheriff of Cornwall

Chancellor and Keeper of the Great Seal (1476–1867?)

 1476 Sir William Allington
 1490 John Arundell, Bishop of Coventry and Lichfield
 1502 Robert Frost
 ? John Morton, Archbishop of Canterbury
 1610?–12? Sir Henry Hobart, 1st Baronet
 1616?–17 Sir Francis Bacon
 1617–? Sir Henry Hobart, 1st Baronet
 17? –17? Nicholas Lechmere, 1st Baron Lechmere
 1729–40 Alexander Denton
 1740–51: Sir Thomas Bootle
 vacant
 1802 Thomas Erskine
 1806–15 William Adam
 1816–18? John Leach
 1843–67? Thomas Pemberton Leigh

Keeper of the Privy Seal (1846?–1933)

 1846? Sir William Gibson-Craig, Bt
 1852 Marquess of Chandos
 1853 Lord Alfred Hervey
 1855 The Viscount Monck
 1858 Henry Brand
 1858 Henry Whitmore
 1859 Sir William Alexander, Bt
 1863 Sir William Dunbar, Bt
 1865 Herbert William Fisher
 1870 The Earl of Leicester
 1901–06 The Earl Spencer
 1907 The Earl of Mount Edgcumbe
 1913–33 The Lord Clinton
 see Lord Warden of the Stannaries since 1933

Receiver-General (1400–present)

 1400 John Waterton
 1413 John Willecotes
 1422 John Copleston Jnr
 1422 Thomas Congreve
 1423 Lewis John
 1433 Robert Whittingham
 1439 Thomas Gloucester
 1444 John Brecknock
 1456 Robert Whittingham
 1461 William, Lord Hastings
 1473 Anthony Woodville, 2nd Earl Rivers
 1483 Sir John Sapcotes
 1485 Sir Robert Willoughby (later 1st Lord Willoughby de Broke)
 1503 Sir Richard Nanfan
 1507 Sir John Arundell
 1533 Sir Thomas Arundell
 1553 Sir Henry Gates
 1553 Sir Edward Waldegrave
 1553 John Coswarth
 1574 Thomas Cosoworth
 1586 Sir Francis Godolphin
 1604 Sir Richard Smith
 1618 Thomas Smyth
 1637 Sir David Cunningham
 1638 Robert Napier of Punknoll
 1643 Richard Nicholl
 1646 Arthur Upton
 1650 George Crompton
 1650 Gabriel Tailor
 1709–12 Robert Corker
 1715–20 Edward Eliot
 1720–31 Robert Corker
 1731–36 Edward Penrose of Penrose  Law Suite 1749
 bef. 1740–48? Richard Eliot
 1751 Edward Craggs-Eliot, 1st Baron Eliot
 1804 Richard Brinsley Sheridan
 1807 The Viscount Lake
 1808 Richard Brinsley Sheridan
 1816 Sir John McMahon, 1st Baronet
 1817 Lord William Gordon
 1823 Sir William Knighton, Bt
 1830? Sir Henry Wheatley, Bt
 1849–62 Office abolished.
 1862 Sir Charles Beaumont Phipps
 1866 Sir Thomas Myddleton-Biddulph
 1878 Sir William Thomas Knollys
 1883 Sir John Rose, Bt
 1888 Sir Robert Kingscote
 1908 The Lord Revelstoke
 1929–36 Sir Edward Peacock
 1961–73 The Lord Ashburton
 1974 The Hon. Sir John Baring (later Lord Ashburton)
 1990 The Earl Cairns
 2000 The Hon. James Leigh-Pemberton

Attorney-General (1457–present)

 1457 Thomas Throckmorton
 1472 Sir William Allington
 1477 John Twynho
 1490 John Mordaunt
 1511 William Esyngton
 1515 William Ruddall
 1515 Sir Robert Southwell
 1529 John Baldewyn
 1532 Sir Richard Riche
 1532 John Cocke
 1561 John Penne
 1567? Stephen Brente
 1599? Thomas Harrison
 1601 Hannibal Vivian
 1603 Gilbert Mitchell
 1604 Thomas Fleetwood
 1605 Thomas Stephens
 1615 Sir John Walter
 1632? William Noye
 1634 Sir John Bankes
 1635 Sir Richard Lane
 1643 Sir Robert Holborne
 1648? Francis Buller
 1698 Francis Pengelly
 1714 Spencer Cowper
 1728 William Lee
 1730 William Fortescue
 1736 Robert Pauncefort
 1748 Henry Bathurst
 1754 Robert Henley (later Earl of Northington)
 1756 Charles Pratt (later Earl Camden)
 1783 Thomas Erskine (later Lord Erskine)
 1793 Robert Graham
 1800 Vicary Gibbs
 1805 William Adam
 1806 William Garrow
 1812 Joseph Jekyll
 1816 William Draper Best
 1819 Charles Warren
 1841 Thomas Pemberton (later Lord Kingsdown)
 1843 The Hon. John Chetwynd-Talbot
 1852 Sir Edward Smirke
 1863 Sir William Alexander, Bt
 1873 George Loch
 1877 Alfred Henry Thesiger
 1877 Sir Charles Hall
 1892 Sir Henry James (later Lord James of Hereford)
 1895 Charles Cripps (later Lord Parmoor)
 1914 George Cave (later Lord Cave)
 1915 Henry Duke (later Lord Merrivale)
 1920 Sir Douglas Hogg (later Viscount Hailsham)
 1923 Anthony Hawke
 1928 Geoffrey Lawrence (later Lord Trevethin and Oaksey)
 1932 Walter Monckton (later Lord Monckton of Brenchley)
 1951–60: Charles Russell (later Lord Russell of Killowen)
 1960 Sir Joseph Molony
 1969 Anthony Lloyd
 1978 Andrew Morritt
 1988 Robert Carnwath
 1994 Sir Jeremy Sullivan
 1998 Nicholas Underhill
 2006 Jonathan Crow

Surveyor-General (1747–1849)

 1729–38 Richard Eliot
 1747 The Lord Baltimore
 1751 Edward Bayntun-Rolt
 1796? Sir John Morshead, Bt
 1808–29 Benjamin Tucker
 1833 Philip Sidney, 1st Baron De L'Isle and Dudley
 1849 James Robert Gardiner

Keeper of the Records (1843–present)

 1843–49 James Robert Gardiner
 ?–1873 Joshua Wigley Bateman
 1873 George Wilmshurst
 1886 Sir Maurice Holzmann, KCVO
 1908 Sir Walter Peacock
 1930 Major Hilgrove McCormick
 1936–54 Sir Clive Burn
 ?–1972 Sir Patrick Kingsley
 1972 Francis Anthony Gray
 1981 John Walter Yeoman Higgs
 1987 Sir David Landale
 1993 Sir John James
 1997 Sir Walter Ross, KCVO
 2013 Alastair Martin

Auditor (1509–1993)

 1509 Hugh Molyneux
 1543? Robert Hennage
 1543 Thomas Mildmay
 1547 Walter Mildmay
 1567 John Conyers
 1574? William Neale
 1590? Robert Paddon
 1602 Nathaniel Fulwer
 1603 Richard Connock
 1622 Thomas Gewen
 1633 John Downes
 1645 William Loving
 1661 William Harbord
 1692 Philip Bertie
 1704–23? Albemarle Bertie
 1735–51 Charles Montagu
 1751–67 William Trevanion
 1768 Richard Hussey
 1770 John Buller
 1783 Henry Lyte
 1791 John Willett Payne
 1796 Thomas Tyrwhitt
 1803 Sir John McMahon, Bt
 1816 Sir Benjamin Bloomfield
 1817 Sir William Knighton, Bt
 1823–41 George Harrison
 1843 Edward White
 1851 Sir William Anderson
 1891 Lesley Probyn
 1916–? Laurence Halsey
 1957–? Edmund Parker
 1971–93 Jeffery Bowman

Solicitor-General (1714–present)

 1714 John Fortescue Aland
 1715 Laurence Carter 
 1717 Charles Talbot
 1726 John Finch
 1729 William Fortescue
 1730 Robert Pauncefort
 1736 Richard Hollings
 1741 Alexander Hume Campbell
 1746 Henry Bathurst
 1748 Paul Joddrell
 1751 Robert Henley
 1754 Charles Yorke
 1783 Sir Arthur Leary Piggott
 1793 John Anstruther
 1795 Vicary Gibbs
 1800 Thomas Manners-Sutton
 1802 William Adam
 1805 Joseph Jekyll
 1812 Samuel Shepherd
 1813 William Draper Best
 1816 William Harrison
 1841? Edward Smirke
 1908 Robert Ernest Tucker
 1940 Sir Clive Burn
 1954 Brian Stopford
 1972 Joseph Frederick Burrell
 1976 Henry Boyd-Carpenter
 1994 James Furber

Cornwall Herald

1398-?: John Hilton, Harper

Chief Commissioner

Francis Seymour-Conway, 3rd Marquess of Hertford

Havener (Keeper of the Havenary (Ports) of Cornwall and the Port of Plymouth, Devon (1337–1617)

 1337 Thomas FitzHenry
 1373 Walter Bray
 1376 Thomas Asshenden
 1377–88 Richard Hampton
 1386–95 John Slegh
 1388–91 John Maudelyn
 1391–5 William Skelton
 1395 John Knyveton
 1395 Thomas Galy
 1397 Edward, Duke of Aumerle
 1399 John Norbury
 1404–7 John Snede
 1411 John Clink
 1415 Thomas Chaucer
 1426 Robert Treage
 1427 John Lawhier
 1431 Thomas Treffry
 1432 Thomas Est
 1454 John Delabere
 1455 Thomas Bodulgate (Joint)
 1455 Geoffrey Kidwelly (Joint)
 1461 Thomas Clemens (Joint)
 1461 Richard Edgcumbe (Joint)
 1461 Geoffrey Kidwelly (Joint)
 1461 Nicholas Loure
 1471 Sir Thomas Vaughan
 1472 William Richmond
 1477 Richard Holton
 1483 Sir James Tyrell
 1485 Robert Walshe
 1486 John Monkeley
 ? Benedict Killegrew
 1502 Thomas Elyot
 1515 John Thomas
 1516? Henry Pennage
 1517 John Amodas
 1549? William Reskymer
 1552 Henry Killegrew
 1553 John Cliff
 1578? Peter Killigrew
 1601? Joseph Killegrew
 1616? Sir John Killigrew
 1626? Robert Longdon
 1617 William Roscarrock
 Thomas Gewen
 Sir William Morrice
 Sir William Morice, 1st Baronet

Feodary (Escheator) in Cornwall and Devon (1403–1632)

 1403 John Haweley Jnr
 1437 Michael Power
 1451 Edward Ellesmere
 1460 Avery Cornburgh
 1473 Sir John Fogge and John Fogge (son)
 1484 Thomas Sapcotes
 1485 Sir Richard Edgcumbe
 1489 Peter Edgcumbe
 1502 Sir Peter Edgcumbe (joint)
 1502–6 Roger Holland (joint)
 1539 Sir Hugh Trevanyon
 1551 Hugh Trevanyon
 1565–6 Richard Strode
 1574 Edward Trevanyon
 1576 Henry Carye
 1581? William Killigrew
 1604 Richard Billing
 1607 John Sorrell
 1626? Robert Langdon
 1632? Stephen Smyth
 ? Henry Carew

President of the Council
Albert, Prince Consort

References

Bibliography
For lists of the Duchy's officers (1337–1650):
 .
 .
 .
 .

History of Cornwall
Duchy of Cornwall